The following is a list of clubs who have played in the Bangladesh Women's Football League since its formation in 2011 to the current 2021–22 season.

In Bangladesh, there is only one women's football league: the Bangladesh Women's Football League. Thus, there are no promotions or relegation to date.

Bangladesh Women's Football League

Current clubs (2021–22)
Twelve clubs will compete in the 2021–22 Bangladesh Women's Football League:

Former clubs
The following clubs who had played in the Bangladesh Women's Football League in the earlier seasons but don't participate in the current 2021–22 season:

 Arambagh KS Women
 Bangladesh Police FC Women
 Begum Anowara SC
 Brothers Union Women
 Dhaka Abahani Women
 Dhaka Mohammedan Women
 Dhaka Wanderers Club Women 
 Dipali Jubo Sangha 
 FC Uttar Bongo
 Feni SC Women
 Jatrabari Krira Sangha
 Kachijhuli Sporting Club
 Sheikh Jamal Dhanmondi Club Women
 Spartan MK Gallactico Sylhet FC
 Wari Club Women

See also 
 Women's football in Bangladesh
 List of women's national football teams
 International competitions in women's association football

References 

Bangladesh Women's Football League
 
Bangladesh women
Women's